This is a list of notable events in country music that took place in the year 2003.

Events
March 10 – During a concert in London, England, Dixie Chicks lead singer Natalie Maines said that the band was "ashamed the President of the United States is from Texas" (referring to Maines' hometown of Lubbock and President Bush hailing from the same state). The comment sparked intense controversy and outrage among Americans, including a large share of country music fans.
Those who took offense to Maines' comments based their feelings on a number of grounds, including that the country was then on the verge of declaring war on Iraq (which happened less than two weeks later) and that Maines made the comments on foreign soil. Chicks' supporters, meanwhile, cited their right to free speech. Radio stations – perhaps riding the wave of fan sentiment – refuse to play their music on the air, including their then-current hit, "Travelin' Soldier" (which ironically was about a soldier who is about to go to war); some even sponsor anti-Dixie Chicks promotional events, such as disposing and destroying Chicks' compact discs and other merchandise. Maines, meanwhile, defended her stance during a televised interview with Diane Sawyer.
Maines and her bandmates – Emily Robison and Martie Maguire – appeared nude (with private parts strategically covered) on the May 2 cover of Entertainment Weekly. Their bodies were covered with words such as "Saddam's Angels" and "Traitor."
June 11 – Country Music magazine announces that it will cease publication, effective with the August/September 2003 issue. The final issue's cover artist was Martina McBride, as part of a salute to women in country music. The magazine's sister publication, Country Weekly, which had largely taken over the market for country music-related journalism, picks up part of the slack left by the closure of Country Music, both of which were published by American Media Inc.
July – The Rascal Flatts video, "I Melt," comes under fire by conservative groups because it contains brief scenes of nudity, in particular lovemaking scenes featuring band member Joe Don Rooney and model Christina Auria. Groups called for the video to be banned from airplay on CMT and Great American Country. Eventually, Rascal Flatts released an edited version of the video, which aired during daytime hours on the two country music-oriented networks.
December – The John F. Kennedy Center for the Performing Arts honors Loretta Lynn for her lifetime contributions to the arts.

No dates
 Throughout the year, country music was beset by the deaths of notable figures, including Johnny Cash, whose vastly influential musicianship transcended genres. His wife of 35 years (and longtime singing partner), June Carter Cash, had died four months earlier. Both had appeared in a CMT-aired interview, discussing their lives and careers; it was taped earlier in the year.
 Other notables that died during the year: Johnny Paycheck, Felice Bryant, Floyd Tillman, Wilma Burgess, Don Gibson, Dave Dudley and Gary Stewart.

Top hits of the year
The following songs placed within the Top 20 on the Hot Country Songs charts in 2003:

Top new album releases
The following albums placed within the Top 50 on the Top Country Albums charts in 2003:

Other top albums

Births
 September 29 – Callista Clark, country music singer and songwriter of the 2020s ("It's 'Cause I Am").

Deaths
 February 19 – Johnny Paycheck, 64, legendary singer and songwriter, best known for "Take This Job and Shove It." (complications from asthma and emphysema)
 March 17 – Bill Carlisle, 94, singer-songwriter and comedian, lead singer of the Carlisles and stalwart of the Grand Ole Opry.
 April 22 – Felice Bryant, 77, songwriter and wife of collaborator Boudleaux Bryant.
 May 15 – June Carter Cash, 73, member of the Carter Family and wife of Johnny Cash (complications from heart surgery).
 June 30 – Sam Phillips, 80, founder of Sun Records and major player in emergence of rock and roll and its cross-genre popularity.
 July - Jayne White, 40 of duo JJ White.ayne
 August 22 – Floyd Tillman, 88, 1930s and 1940s singer instrumental in creating the genre's western swing and honky-tonk styles.
 August 26 – Wilma Burgess, 64, country vocalist of the 1960s best known for "Misty Blue."
 September 12 – Johnny Cash, 71, vastly influential singer/songwriter/guitarist whose music transcended musical boundaries; best known for hits like "Ring of Fire," "I Walk the Line," "Hurt," and "A Boy Named Sue" (diabetic complications).
 November 17 – Don Gibson, 75, influential songwriter (best known for "I Can't Stop Loving You") and singer who helped introduce the Nashville Sound (natural causes).
 December 16 – Gary Stewart, 58, rough, outlaw-styled country singer known for his drinking songs ("She's Actin' Single (I'm Drinkin' Doubles)") (suicide).
 December 22 – Dave Dudley, 75, best known for his 1960s-era truck driving songs, such as "Six Days on the Road" (heart attack).

Hall of Fame inductees

Bluegrass Music Hall of Fame inductees
J. D. Crowe

Country Music Hall of Fame inductees
Floyd Cramer (1933–1997)
Carl Smith (1927–2010)

Canadian Country Music Hall of Fame inductees
Sylvia Tyson
J. Edward Preston
Fred King
Charlie Russell
Art Wallman

Major awards

Grammy Awards
Best Female Country Vocal Performance – "Keep on the Sunny Side", June Carter Cash
Best Male Country Vocal Performance – "Next Big Thing", Vince Gill
Best Country Performance by a Duo or Group with Vocal – "A Simple Life", Ricky Skaggs & Kentucky Thunder
Best Country Collaboration with Vocals – "How's the World Treating You", Alison Krauss and James Taylor
Best Country Instrumental Performance – "Cluck Old Hen", Alison Krauss & Union Station
Best Country Song – "It's Five O'Clock Somewhere", Jim "Moose" Brown and Don Rollins
Best Country Album – Livin', Lovin', Losin' – Songs of the Louvin Brothers, Various Artists (Producer: Carl Jackson)
Best Bluegrass Album – Live, Alison Krauss & Union Station

Juno Awards
Country Recording of the Year – Up!, Shania Twain

CMT Flameworthy Video Music Awards
Video of the Year – "Courtesy of the Red, White and Blue (The Angry American)", Toby Keith
Male Video of the Year – "Courtesy of the Red, White and Blue (The Angry American)", Toby Keith
Female Video of the Year – "Concrete Angel", Martina McBride
Group/Duo Video of the Year – "These Days", Rascal Flatts
Breakthrough Video of the Year – "Brokenheartsville", Joe Nichols
Hottest Male Video of the Year – "She's My Kind of Rain", Tim McGraw
Hottest Female Video of the Year – "When the Lights Go Down", Faith Hill
Cocky Video of the Year – "Courtesy of the Red, White and Blue (The Angry American)", Toby Keith
Concept Video of the Year – "I'm Gonna Getcha Good!", Shania Twain
Fashion Plate Video of the Year – "She's My Kind of Rain", Tim McGraw
Video Director of the Year – "Concrete Angel", Martina McBride (Director: Deaton Flanigen)
Special Achievement Award – Johnny Cash

Americana Music Honors & Awards 
Album of the Year – American IV: The Man Comes Around (Johnny Cash)
Artist of the Year – Johnny Cash
Song of the Year – "Hurt" (Trent Reznor)
Instrumentalist of the Year – Jerry Douglas
Spirit of Americana/Free Speech Award – Kris Kristofferson
Lifetime Achievement: Songwriting – John Prine
Lifetime Achievement: Performance – Levon Helm
Lifetime Achievement: Executive – Sam Phillips

Academy of Country Music
Entertainer of the Year – Toby Keith
Song of the Year – "Three Wooden Crosses", Doug Johnson, Kim Williams
Single of the Year – "It's Five O'Clock Somewhere", Alan Jackson and Jimmy Buffett
Album of the Year – Shock'n Y'all,  Toby Keith
Top Male Vocalist – Toby Keith
Top Female Vocalist – Martina McBride
Top Vocal Duo – Brooks & Dunn
Top Vocal Group – Rascal Flatts
Top New Artist – Dierks Bentley
Video of the Year – "Beer for My Horses", Toby Keith and Willie Nelson (Director: Michael Salomon)
Vocal Event of the Year – "It's Five O'Clock Somewhere," Alan Jackson and Jimmy Buffett

ARIA Awards 
(presented in Sydney on October 21, 2003)
Best Country Album – Golden Road (Keith Urban)

Canadian Country Music Association
Kraft Cheez Whiz Fans' Choice Award – Terri Clark
Male Artist of the Year – Aaron Lines
Female Artist of the Year – Shania Twain
Group or Duo of the Year – Emerson Drive
SOCAN Song of the Year – "Rocket Girl", Jason McCoy, Denny Carr
Single of the Year – "I Just Wanna Be Mad", Terri Clark
Album of the Year – Up!, Shania Twain
Top Selling Album – Up!, Shania Twain
CMT Video of the Year – "I'm Gonna Getcha Good!", Shania Twain
Chevy Trucks Rising Star Award – Aaron Lines
Roots Artist or Group of the Year – Sean Hogan

Country Music Association
Entertainer of the Year – Alan Jackson
Song of the Year – "Three Wooden Crosses", Doug Johnson, Kim Williams
Single of the Year – "Hurt", Johnny Cash
Album of the Year – American IV: The Man Comes Around, Johnny Cash
Male Vocalist of the Year – Alan Jackson
Female Vocalist of the Year – Martina McBride
Vocal Duo of the Year – Brooks & Dunn
Vocal Group of the Year – Rascal Flatts
Horizon Award – Joe Nichols
Video of the Year – "Hurt", Johnny Cash (Director: Mark Romanek)
Vocal Event of the Year – "It's Five O'Clock Somewhere", Alan Jackson and Jimmy Buffett
Musician of the Year – Randy Scruggs

Further reading
Whitburn, Joel, "Top Country Songs 1944–2005 – 6th Edition." 2005.

References

Other links
Country Music Association
Inductees of the Country Music Hall of Fame

External links
Country Music Hall of Fame

Country
Country music by year